Tzeltal may refer to:

 Tzeltal people, an ethnic group of Mexico
 Tzeltal language, the Mayan language they speak